Brett Beavers (born in Waco, Texas) is an American country music songwriter and producer and the co-author of the book Something Worth Leaving Behind.

Education and early career
Beavers attended Baylor University, where he earned a bachelor of science degree in secondary education in 1985. He spent the next four years playing bass guitar with a small country band throughout Central Texas, honing his skill as a songwriter. After a year away from the music business, when he married and taught high school science in Tyler, Texas, he moved to Nashville, Tennessee, to join a band with Deryl Dodd. Shortly after arriving in Nashville, Beavers began touring with Martina McBride as bass player and bandleader, from 1992–1996, and then with Lee Ann Womack from 1997–2005 in the same capacity. During this time, he started a publishing company and began getting his songs recorded by such artists as Tim McGraw and Billy Ray Cyrus. In 2005, he stopped performing and touring to pursue songwriting and producing on a full-time basis. His brother, Jim, is also a Nashville songwriter.

With Dierks Bentley
Much of Beavers' success has been with Dierks Bentley, for whom he produces and co-writes several of his songs, a collaboration that began in 2001. The partnership has produced several number-one Hot Country Songs, including "Sideways", "Come a Little Closer", "Feel That Fire", and "Every Mile a Memory".  In addition to chart-topping success, the pairing has led to a SOCAN and NSAI Achievement Award for "What Was I Thinkin'", a BMI Award Most Performed Song for "Trying to Stop Your Leaving", and Grammy Award nominations for Best Country Song, "Long Trip Alone" and Country Song of the Year, "Every Mile a Memory". The songs that he has written and produced for Bentley have also led to Beavers being honored at the BMI Country Awards every year from 2006–2009.

Author
Along with Tom Douglas, Beavers wrote the inspirational book Something Worth Leaving Behind, based on the song of the same name that they co-wrote for Lee Ann Womack.

References

Living people
Country musicians from Texas
American country record producers
American country songwriters
American male songwriters
American country bass guitarists
Baylor University alumni
People from Waco, Texas
Musicians from Nashville, Tennessee
Songwriters from Texas
Songwriters from Tennessee
Guitarists from Tennessee
Guitarists from Texas
American male bass guitarists
Record producers from Texas
Record producers from Tennessee
Country musicians from Tennessee
Year of birth missing (living people)